Doris Jones (born 1924) was a member of the All-American Girls Professional Baseball League (AAGPBL). She was born in Sellersburg, Indiana. In 1945, she played for the South Bend Blue Sox, in South Bend, Indiana. Doris only played for one season and was simultaneously enrolled at Georgetown College, majoring in Art. Her ambition was to become a professional cartoonist.

References

1924 births
Possibly living people
All-American Girls Professional Baseball League players
South Bend Blue Sox players
Sports in South Bend, Indiana
Baseball players from Indiana
People from Sellersburg, Indiana